The Syria National Beach Soccer Team represents Syria in international beach soccer competitions and is controlled by the Syrian Football Association, the governing body for football in the Syria.

Current squad
The following is the squad picked to play at the 2010 Asian Beach Games in December 2010. A number of these players featured at the 2011 world cup qualifiers. 

Correct as of December 2010

Achievements
 FIFA Beach Soccer World Cup qualification (AFC) Best: Eighth place
 2011
 Asian Beach Games Best: Sixth place
 2010

External links
 Beach Games Squad

Asian national beach soccer teams
Beach Soccer